The Second Wakatsuki Cabinet is the 28th Cabinet of Japan led by Wakatsuki Reijirō from April 14 to December 13, 1931.

Cabinet

References 

Cabinet of Japan
1931 establishments in Japan
Cabinets established in 1931
Cabinets disestablished in 1931